Barid Al Sharq (Arabic: Orient Post) was an Arabic propaganda publication published in Berlin in the period 1939–1944. It was distributed in the Arab countries and Palestine to improve the relations between Nazi Germany and Arabs.

History and profile
Barid Al Sharq was launched in October 1939. The headquarters of the newspaper was in Berlin, and the founding publisher was the foreign language service of the Reichs-Rundfunk-Gesellschaft, Nazi broadcasting corporation. From 1941 Barid Al Sharq was published directly by the Propaganda Ministry. The paper was distributed to Arabs countries and European countries where Arab exiles lived.

The editor of the paper was Kamal al Din al Galal who was working at the Islamic Culture Center in Berlin. Shakib Arslan and Abdurreshid Ibrahim were among the contributors. One of its goals was to promote Amin al-Husseini, Grand Mufti of Jerusalem, as the leader of Arabs, emphasizing the similarities between National Socialism and Islam. It often published the speeches of Adolf Hitler and Amin al-Husseini and articles about the ideology of Nazism as well as about the colonial ambitions of the United States, the United Kingdom and the Soviet Union over Arab countries. In 1943 Barid Al Sharq had a circulation of nearly 5,000 copies. It folded in 1944.

The issues of Barid Al Sharq are archived by the German National Library in Leipzig and the Berlin State Library.

References

1939 establishments in Germany
1944 disestablishments in Germany
Arabic-language newspapers
Defunct newspapers published in Germany
Former state media
Nazi newspapers
Newspapers published in Berlin
Propaganda newspapers and magazines
Newspapers established in 1939
Publications disestablished in 1944